Avdotyino is a rural locality (a selo) in Aksinyinskoye Rural Settlement of Aksinyinskoye Rural Settlement, Stupinsky District, Moscow Oblast, Russia. The population was 75 as of 2010. There are 4 streets.

Geography 
The khutor is located between rivers Kononkova and Severka, 49 km north of Stupino (the district's administrative centre) by road. Bolshoye Alexeyevskoye is the nearest rural locality.

References 

Rural localities in Stupinsky District